Pir Hayati-ye Sofla (also Romanized as Pīr Ḩayātī-ye Soflá; also known as Pīr Ḩayātī, Pīr Ḩayātī-ye Pā’īn, Pīriāī, and Pīryal) is a village in Mahidasht Rural District, Mahidasht District, Kermanshah County, Kermanshah Province, Iran. At the 2006 census, its population was 210, in 47 families.

References 

Populated places in Kermanshah County